Eskiarab is a town in Oltiariq District of Fergana Region, Uzbekistan. It is situated in the south-west of Oltiariq District. The population of the town consists of mainly Uzbeks. It is a historical place containing several ancient places. One of the historic locations is the Kitkontepa ancient monument.

The town population was 12,600 in 2016. In 2009, Eskiarab was given town status. The local time is UTC +5 (UZT).

Climate 
The climate is subtropic. In summer, average temperature is 35 °C, in winter 5-7 °C. 
Annual precipitation ranges between 100 and 150 mm per year.

See also
List of cities in Uzbekistan

References

External links 

Uzbek Pochta Indeks
Open street map of Eskiarab

Populated places in Fergana Region
Urban-type settlements in Uzbekistan
Fergana Oblast